The Holocaust in Yugoslavia includes:
The Holocaust in the Independent State of Croatia
The Holocaust in Serbia
The Holocaust in Bulgaria (occupied areas of Macedonia)
The Holocaust in Slovenia